Ma Bourgogne is a bistro in Place des Vosges in the Le Marais district of Paris. It is on the North-West point and is a café in the traditional French style. It has been around for many years and it has been spoken of as one of the best bistros in Paris.

Jean-Paul Sartre and Simone de Beauvoir came here after escaping from a dangerous protest about Algeria.

See also 
Le Marais
Official Website of Ma Bourgogne

Le Marais
Restaurants in Paris

Buildings and structures in the 4th arrondissement of Paris